Fernando González de Bariodero was a Roman Catholic prelate who served as Bishop of Nicaragua (1556).

Biography
On 29 February 1544, Fernando González de Bariodero was appointed during the papacy of Paul III as Bishop of Nicaragua. On 2 May 1556, he was consecrated bishop. It is unlikely that he took possession of the diocese as a Vicar Capitular, Father Juan Alvarez (1555–1557) continued to serve despite his appointment. His eventual replacement, Lázaro Carrasco, was appointed in 1556 and took possession in 1557.

References

External links and additional sources
 (for Chronology of Bishops) 
 (for Chronology of Bishops) 

16th-century Roman Catholic bishops in Nicaragua
Bishops appointed by Pope Paul III
1549 deaths
Roman Catholic bishops of León in Nicaragua